Jean Choux (1887–1946) was a French/Swiss film director and producer born in Geneva.

Filmography
 La Vocation d'André Carel (1925)
 La Terre qui meurt (1926)
 Le Baiser qui tue (1927)
 Espionnage ou la guerre sans armes (1928, actor)
 Chacun porte sa croix (1929)
 La servante (1929)
 Amours viennoises (1930)
 Un chien qui rapporte (1931)
 Jean de la Lune (1931)
 The Marriage of Mademoiselle Beulemans (1932)
 L'Ange gardien (1933)
 La Banque Nemo (1934)
 Le Greluchon délicat (1934)
 Maternité (1934)
 Paris (1936)
 Une femme sans importance (1937)
 La Glu (1937)
 Miarka (1937)
Café du port (1938)
Paix sur le Rhin (1938)
Rose de sang (1939)
 Angelica (1939)
La Naissance de Salomé (1942)
Port d'attache (1942)
 The Lost Woman (1942)
 Box of Dreams (1945)
L'ange qu'on m'a donné (1945)

References 

French film directors
French film producers
1887 births
1946 deaths
Film people from Geneva